Longdendale is a valley, part of which is in Tameside, Greater Manchester, England.  In the valley are the villages of Broadbottom, Hattersley, Hollingworth and Mottram in Longdendale.  These villages and the surrounding countryside contain 56 listed buildings that are recorded in the National Heritage List for England.  Of these, three are listed at Grade II*, the middle grade, and the others are at Grade II, the lowest grade.  The listed buildings include houses and associated structures, farmhouses, farm buildings, churches and items in churchyards, an ancient cross, a railway viaduct, a school, and two war memorials.


Key

Buildings

References

Citations

Sources

Lists of listed buildings in Greater Manchester